Sridhar is a given name that is also sometimes used as a surname. Notable people with this name include:
Sridhar (actor), Indian actor in the Kannada film industry
Anup Sridhar,  badminton player
C. V. Sridhar, screenwriter and film director
Sreedhar, Telugu actor, Muthyala Muggu fame
H. Sridhar, sound engineer
Joshua Sridhar, composer of film scores and soundtracks in Tamil cinema
M. V. Sridhar, cricketer
Sridhar Babu, Indian politician and member of the Andhra Pradesh Legislative Assembly
Sridhar Lagadapati, founder and head of Larsco Entertainment
Sridhar Rangayan, Indian screenwriter, film director and producer, with a special focus on LGBT subjects
Sridhar Tayur, American business professor
Sridhar (choreographer), Indian choreographer
V. Sridhar, Indian film score and soundtrack composer and lyricist in the Kannada film industry

See also
Sridhara, also spelled Sridhar or Sreedhar, one of lord Vishnu's thousand names when consort to the Hindu goddess Lakshmi
Shridhar